Rudrapur Legislative Assembly constituency is one of the seventy electoral Uttarakhand Legislative Assembly constituencies of Uttarakhand state in India. It includes Rudrapur area of Udham Singh Nagar District.

Rudrapur Legislative Assembly constituency is a part of Nainital-Udhamsingh Nagar (Lok Sabha constituency).

Members of the Legislative Assembly

Election results

2022

See also
 Rudrapur–Kichha (Uttarakhand Assembly constituency)

References

External link
  

Udham Singh Nagar district
Assembly constituencies of Uttarakhand
2002 establishments in Uttarakhand
Constituencies established in 2002
Rudrapur, Uttarakhand